Blue Moon Swamp is the fifth solo studio album by American singer/songwriter John Fogerty, released on May 20, 1997. Guest musicians, the Lonesome River Band, were invited to join in on backing vocals on "Southern Streamline" and "Rambunctious Boy". Other vocal backing was provided by The Waters on "Blueboy" and The Fairfield Four on "A Hundred and Ten in the Shade". Luis Conte accompanied on select songs as a guest percussionist. In 1998, Blue Moon Swamp won Best Rock Album at the 40th Grammy Awards.
The track "Blueboy" was nominated for Best Male Rock Vocal Performance.

Cover
When asked about if the wet Fender guitar used on the cover was real, Fogerty said, "Oh yes, it is a real photo. I bought a new Fender Stratocaster just for this occasion. After the shooting we dried every part of the guitar. Maybe I should put it on show now".

2004 remastered version
In 2004 a remastered version of Blue Moon Swamp was released. It features renewed sound and two bonus tracks, which were previously released on singles in either 1997 or 1998, "Just Pickin'" and "Endless Sleep".

Track listing

Personnel

As published in the liner notes of Warner Bros CD release 9 45426-2:

 John Fogerty – guitars, lap steel, dobro, handclaps, electric sitar, farfisa organ, tambourine (on "Bring It Down to Jelly Roll"), backing vocals (on "Walking in a Hurricane" and " Bad Bad Boy"), mandolin, irish bouzouki, vocals, arrangements, production
 Kenny Aronoff – drums (on most tracks), percussion (on "Joy of my Life")
 Chad Smith - drums (on "Walking in a Hurricane")
 Chester Thompson - drums (on "Blueboy" and "Bad Bad Boy")
 Vinnie Colaiuta - drums (on "Swamp River Days")
 Eddie Bayers - drums (on "A Hundred and Ten in the Shade")
 Jeff Donavan – drums (on "Southern Streamline" and "Blue Moon Nights")
 Bob Glaub - bass (on most tracks), handclaps (on "Blueboy")
 Donald Dunn - bass (on "Blueboy")
 Howie Epstein - bass (on "Rambunctious Boy")
 John Clayton - bass (on "A Hundred and Ten in the Shade")
 Michael Rhodes - bass (on "Southern Streamline")
 Phil Chen - bass (on "Bad Bad Boy")
 Dave Taylor – bass (on "Walking in a Hurricane")
 Luis Conte – clavé, maracas, tambourine, percussion, shaker
 Lonesome River Band (Ronnie Bowman, Don Rigsby, Kenny Smith) – backing vocals (on "Southern Streamline" and "Rambunctious Boy")
 The Waters (Julia Waters, Maxine Waters, Oren Waters) – backing vocals (on "Blueboy")
 The Fairfield Four (James Hill, Isaac Freeman, Wilson Waters, Jr., Robert Hamlett, Joe Rice) – backing vocals (on "A Hundred and Ten in the Shade")
 Ryan Freeland - handclaps (on "Hot Rod Heart")
 Bob Fogerty - handclaps
 Andy Brauer - handclaps (on "Blueboy")
 Tommy "V" Verdonck - handclaps (on "Bring It Down to Jelly Roll" and "Rambunctious Boy")
 Lyndsay, Shane, Tyler, Julie - kids in the crowd (on "Blueboy")

 Bob Clearmountain – mixing
 John Lowson – engineering
 Bob Ludwig – mastering (at Gateway Mastering Studios)
 Bob Fogerty – personal management
 Linda Cobb – art direction, design
 Kip Lott – photography, CD label
 Larry Corby – booklet back cover design
 Lonesome River Band courtesy of Sugar Hill Records

Charts

Weekly charts

Year-end charts

Certifications

References
 Album: Blue Moon Swamp, John Fogerty, 1997, Warner Bros. Records, CA, cat. 9-45426-2

External links
 John Fogerty official site
 John Fogerty information site
 Warner Bros. Records

1997 albums
Albums produced by John Fogerty
Grammy Award for Best Rock Album
John Fogerty albums
Warner Records albums